In the United States, federal funds are overnight borrowings between banks and other entities to maintain their bank reserves at the Federal Reserve. Banks keep reserves at Federal Reserve Banks to meet their reserve requirements and to clear financial transactions. Transactions in the federal funds market enable depository institutions with reserve balances in excess of reserve requirements to lend reserves to institutions with reserve deficiencies. These loans are usually made for one day only, that is, "overnight".  The interest rate at which these deals are done is called the federal funds rate. Federal funds are not collateralized; like eurodollars, they are an unsecured interbank loan.

Federal funds transactions by regulated financial institutions neither increase nor decrease total reserves in the banking system as a whole. Instead, they redistribute reserves.  Before 2008, this meant that otherwise idle funds could yield a return. (Since 2008, the Fed has paid interest on bank reserves, including excess reserves.) Banks may borrow these funds in order to meet the reserves required to back their deposits.  Federal funds are definitive money, meaning that they are available for immediate spending, while checks and many other forms of money must be cleared by banks and typically take several days before becoming available for spending.

Participants in the federal funds market include commercial banks, savings and loan associations, government-sponsored enterprises, branches of foreign banks in the United States, federal agencies, and securities firms. Many relatively small institutions that accumulate reserves in excess of their requirements lend reserves overnight to money center and large regional banks, as well as to foreign banks operating in the United States. Federal agencies also lend idle funds in the federal funds market.

The Fed, which is the central bank of the United States, conducts monetary policy primarily by targeting a certain value for the federal funds rate. If the Fed wishes to move to, for example, a more expansionary monetary policy, it conducts open market operations, which includes primarily bank reserves; since this puts more liquidity into the banking system, it pushes down the federal funds rate.

See also
Arbitrage
Discount rate
Opportunity cost
LIBOR
Repurchase agreement

References

External links
Federal Funds - Fedpoints -  Federal Reserve Bank of New York
Instruments of the Money Market: See Chapter 2 - Federal Funds 

Federal Reserve System
Interest rates